Qeshlaq-e Hajj Aspar Kandi (also Romanized as Qeshlāq-e Ḩājj Āspar Kandī) is a village in Aslan Duz Rural District, Aslan Duz District, Parsabad County, Ardabil Province, Iran. At the 2006 census, its population was 109, in 15 families.

References 

Towns and villages in Parsabad County